Mahakumbukkadawala Divisional Secretariat is a  Divisional Secretariat  of Puttalam District, of North Western Province, Sri Lanka.

References
 Divisional Secretariats
 Grama niladhari 

Divisional Secretariats of Puttalam District